Narayanpur is a large village in Bhatar CD block in Bardhaman Sadar North subdivision of Purba Bardhaman district in the state of West Bengal, India.

Population and house data 
The Narayanpur village has population of 2285 of which 1141 are males while 1144 are females as per Population Census 2011.
In Narayanpur village population of children with age 0-6 is 244 which makes up 10.68 % of total population of village. Average Sex Ratio of Narayanpur village is 1003 which is higher than West Bengal state average of 950. Child Sex Ratio for the Narayanpur as per census is 937, lower than West Bengal average of 956.
Narayanpur village has lower literacy rate compared to West Bengal. In 2011, literacy rate of Narayanpur village was 73.79 % compared to 76.26 % of West Bengal. In Narayanpur Male literacy stands at 84.04 % while female literacy rate was 63.65 %.

References 

Villages in Purba Bardhaman district